The 1995 Spengler Cup was held in Davos, Switzerland, from December 26 to December 31, 1995.  All matches were played at HC Davos's home arena, Eisstadion Davos. The final was won 3-0 by Team Canada over Lada Togliatti.

Teams participating
 Lada Togliatti
 Team Canada
 Färjestads BK
 HIFK
 HC Davos

Tournament

Round-Robin results

Finals

External links
Spenglercup.ch

1995-96
1995–96 in Swiss ice hockey
1995–96 in Russian ice hockey
1995–96 in Canadian ice hockey
1995–96 in Finnish ice hockey
1995–96 in Swedish ice hockey
December 1995 sports events in Europe